Ikorodu is a large city in Lagos State, Nigeria.  It is located to the north-east of Lagos, along the Lagos Lagoon and shares boundary with Ogun State. With a population of over 1million inhabitant, Ikorodu is currently the 12 largest city in Nigeria and growing at a rate of 5.26% annually, it is projected to reach 1.7 million inhabitant by 2035, It is the largest local government in Lagos State. Indigenous settlers of Ikorodu emigrated from Sagamu in Ogun state.

Geography and economy
Situated approximately 37 km north of Lagos, Ikorodu is bounded to the south by the Lagos Lagoon, to the north by a boundary with Ogun State, and to the east by a boundary with Agbowa-Ikosi, a town in Epe Division of Lagos State. The town has grown significantly in the past 40 years and is divided into sixteen or seventeen "Ituns" or minor areas. The main industries in the town are trading, farming and manufacturing. Ijebu dialect is widely spoken in ikorodu.

Nearby major towns include Imota, Isiu, Liadi, Egbin, Ijede, Igbogbo and Bayeku, all of which constitute their own Local Council Development Area with their own traditional rulers (Obas). Together these areas make up Ikorodu Division.

Ikorodu Division has a large industrial area containing several factories. The town of Ikorodu itself is home to branches of several established Nigerian banks.

Ikorodu is the fastest growing part-exurb of Lagos metropolis, owing in part to increasing influx of people from Ikorodu's surrounding towns and villages attracted by the town's proximity to Lagos.

In 2003, the existing Ikorodu LGAs was split for administrative purposes into Local Council Development Areas. These lower-tier administrative units now number 6: Imota, Igbogbo/Bayeku, Ijede, Ikorodu North, Ikorodu West,  Ikorodu.

Economy

Imota rice mill 

The Imota rice mill is an agricultural plant. It was built in 2021 and will commence full production in the second quarter of 2022.

Capacity 
The rice mill has a capacity to produce 2.8 million bags of 50 kg bags of rice yearly, while generating 1,500 direct jobs and 254,000 indirect jobs. On completion, in line with the estimated installed infrastructure of the facility, the production capacity of the rice mill in Imota will set it among the largest in the world, and the largest in sub-Saharan Africa.

Economic effect 
According to Lagos State governor Sanwo-Olu, full production of the facility will drastically reduce prices of rice and pressure to purchase the commodity. At this moment (early 2022) Nigeria produces husk rice, yet imports hulled/polished rice at a higher price. Processing the national staple food rice in its own country therefore should improve Nigeria's trade balance.

Technical process 
In a rice mill, primarily the cereals spelt, barley, oats, millet and rice are hulled, i.e. the husks that are firmly attached to the grain and do not fall off during threshing are removed (dehusking). The husks are indigestible for the human organism and would negatively influence the taste and chewing sensations. Furthermore, in a rice mill, the hulled cereal grains are usually also subsequently rolled (oat flakes), cut (groats) or polished (rice, rolled barley). Other possible processing steps are mostly identical to those in a grain mill.

Surroundings 
The State Government is also developing an industrial park adjacent to the mill. Governor Sanwo-Olu said the park would have amenities that would make businesses thrive and bring returns on investment to business owners.

Religion
Inhabitants of Ikorodu include adherents to several religions, including Christianity, Islam, and traditional worship.

Education
Within greater Ikorodu there are 69 public primary schools and 12 secondary schools. There are also several private nurseries, primary and secondary schools, and two tertiary institutions.

These schools include:

 Caleb University, a private university located in the Imota area of the town, the first private university in Lagos.
 De-Multilaurel comprehensive college 
 De-Young Comprehensive College, Aga
 Difas Schools Odogunyan
 Elepe Community Senior High School
 Goodswill Secondary School
 Goshen International School
 Government College Ikorodu
 Government Technical College
 Homat Group of Schools
 Ipakodo Grammar School
 Ikorodu Grammar School
 Ikorodu High School
 Lagos State Polytechnic Ikorodu.
 Lagos State Civil Service Model College, Igbogbo
 Linksbond College, Ikorodu
 Livingstone College, Ikorodu
 Odogunyan Secondary School, Odogunyan, Ikorodu
 Oreyo Senior Grammar School
 Oriwu Senior Model College
 Prev Academy, Ikorodu
 Royal Le Hope International School
 Sagab college, solomade Ikorodu
 Seatos Schools, Ikorodu
 Shams-El Deen Grammar School
 Stars International College, Ikorodu
 The Laurel Hall College, Ikorodu. 
 The Saints International School, Isawo, Ikorodu
 Tindip schools
Uncle Bayus Group of Schools
 United High School
 Yewa Grammar School, Aga-Ikorodu

 Top-ville college, Isawo, Ikorodu.
Zumuratul islamiyyah senior grammar school

Ikorodu Divisional Library
There are several public libraries that are accessible to students, teachers, researchers and anyone who loves to read newspaper or any material of their choice.
 Ikorodu Town hall library located at T.O.S Benson Rd.
 Laspotech library.

Tourist centres 

 Cradoo Lake Waterfront, Ipakodo and Ibeshe.
 Egbin Thermal Station, Egbin, largest thermal power facility in Africa [home to Lagos Independent Power Project].
 Ijede Warm Springs
 Ikorodu Lighter Port Terminal, lpakodo
 Iledi Oshugbo Abalaiye Ikorodu: sacred groove for the installation of Ikorodu Kings
 Lagos State Polytechnic, Odogunyan, Ikorodu
 Palace of the Ayangburen of Ikorodu.
 Voice of Nigeria [VON] Transmitting Station, Ikorodu

References

External links

 Ikorodu Local Government

 
Local Government Areas in Lagos State
Local Government Areas in Yorubaland